The following is an alphabetical list of members of the United States House of Representatives from the state of Colorado.  For chronological tables of members of both houses of the United States Congress from the state (through the present day), see United States congressional delegations from Colorado.  The list of names should be complete (as of January 3, 2019), but other data may be incomplete. It includes members who have represented both the state and the territory, both past and present.

Current members

Updated January 2023.

 : Diana DeGette (D) (since 1997)
 : Joe Neguse (D) (since 2019)
 : Lauren Boebert (R) (since 2021)
 : Ken Buck (R) (since 2015)
 : Doug Lamborn (R) (since 2007)
 : Jason Crow (D) (since 2019)
 : Brittany Pettersen (D) (since 2023)
 : Yadira Caraveo (D) (since 2023)

List of members and delegates

See also

United States congressional delegations from Colorado
List of United States senators from Colorado
Colorado's congressional districts

References

External links
Biographical Directory of the United States Congress

Colorado

United States Representatives